Thomas A. Roycraft (May 26, 1853 – February 2, 1944) was an American farmer, businessman, and politician.

Biography 
Born in County Cork, Ireland, Roycraft emigrated with his parents to the United States in 1862. Roycraft lived on a farm near Omro, Wisconsin, Winnebago County, Wisconsin. He then moved to Lafayette, Chippewa County, Wisconsin.

He organized the Lafayette Dairy Company and was director of the Eagle Point Insurance Company. Roycraft served as chairman, assessor, and treasurer of the Town of Lafayette and was active in the Republican Party. From 1905 to 1909 again in 1911, Roycraft served in the Wisconsin State Assembly. Roycraft died at his home in Chippewa Falls, Wisconsin.

Notes

1853 births
1944 deaths
Irish emigrants to the United States (before 1923)
People from County Cork
People from Chippewa County, Wisconsin
People from Omro, Wisconsin
Businesspeople from Wisconsin
Farmers from Wisconsin
Mayors of places in Wisconsin
Republican Party members of the Wisconsin State Assembly